Dendrolaelaps is a genus of mites in the family Digamasellidae. There are more than 170 described species in Dendrolaelaps.

See also
 List of Dendrolaelaps species

References

Mesostigmata